The Italian Roman Catholic diocese of Conversano-Monopoli, in Apulia, has existed since 1986, when the diocese of Monopoli was united with the historic diocese of Conversano. The diocese is a suffragan of the Archdiocese of Bari-Bitonto.

History

Conversano is the ancient Cupersanum. After the invasion of the Normans, it was for a while the seat of a duchy; later, however, it became a fief of the dukes of Atri.

Local tradition preserves the name of a bishop, Simplicius, who attended the Roman synod of 487 and died in 492, but he belongs to legend, not history. Ferdinando Ughelli prints the narrative of Francesco Giuliano of Conversano concerning Simplicius, but states that it seems to him to be highly suspect, and maybe deliberately invented falsehoods or corrupt, since there are some things found in it which cannot be true.

The first alleged bishop of Conversano was Hilarius, present at the Roman synod of 501. His name however is a false reading of the acts of the synod; he actually belonged to Tempsa in the Abruzzi, not to Conversano in Apulia.

No other names are recorded up to the episcopate of Leo, mentioned in a document of 1088.

In 1670 (and 1744) the Chapter of the Cathedral of the Assumption of the Body of the Blessed Virgin Mary into Heaven was composed of four dignities (the Archdeacon, the Archpriest, the Cantor and the Primicerius) and twenty-six Canons.  In the city of approximately 7,000 inhabitants (1744) there were five religious houses for men and three monasteries for men.

Bishops

Diocese of Conversano

to 1400
...
 Leo (attested 1088)
...
Cafisius (attested 1179, 1180)
Guilelmus (attested 1188 – April 1202)
Ignotus (attested 1207)
Concilius (attested April 1212 – 9 October 1231)
 Stefano, O.Cist. (attested 1267 – 1274)
...
 Giovanni de Gropi (c. 1283)
...
 Guillelmus (attested 1318, 1321)
 Petrus Baccari (attested 1335, 1342)
 Stefano (7 January 1351 – 1355?)
 Petrus de Ytro (19 February 1356 – )
 Guilelmus (Avignon Obedience)
 Angelo de Cupersano, O.Min. (12 July 1393 – ) (Avignon Obedience)
 Amicus (Antonius) (Roman Obedience)
 Jacobus ( – 22 December 1399) (Roman Obedience)

1400 to 1600

 Franciscus
Stefano de Alfano (9 March 1403 – 1423)
Antonio Guidotti (9 Sep 1423 – 1432 Died)
Marino Orsini (4 November 1432 – 29 April 1437) (Administrator)
Andrea Veroli (29 Apr 1437 – 25 Sep 1439)
 Donato Bottini, O.E.S.A. (9 October 1439 – 4 September 1448)
Pietro de Miggola, O.M. (4 September 1448 – 1464)
Paolo de Torcoli (30 November 1465 – d. 1482)
Sulpicio Acquaviva d'Aragona (17 Feb 1483 – 1494 Died)
Vincenzo Pistacchio (1494 – 3 Nov 1499 Appointed, Bishop of Bitetto)
Donato Acquaviva d'Aragona (1499 – 1528 Died)
Antonio Sanseverino, O.S.Io.Hieros. (28 Jul 1529 – 11 Feb 1534 Resigned) 
Giacomo Antonio Carrozza (1534 – 1560 Died)
Giovanni Francesco Lottini (1560 – 1561 Resigned) 
Romolo de Valentibus (1561 – 1579 Died)
Francesco Maria Sforza (1579 – 1605 Died)

1600 to 1800

Pietro Capullio, O.F.M. Conv. (31 Aug 1605 – 24 Jun 1625 Died)
Vincenzo Martinelli (bishop), O.P. (18 Aug 1625 – 20 Sep 1632)
Antonio Brunachio (24 Nov 1632 – 1 Jan 1638 Died)
Agostino Ferentillo (19 Apr 1638 – 7 Sep 1641 Died)
Pietro Paolo Bonsi (26 May 1642 – 1658 Died)
Giuseppe Palermo (8 Dec 1658 – 1 Sep 1670)
 Giovanni Stefano Sanarica (Senarega), O.S.B. (23 Feb 1671 – 16 Jun 1679 Died) 
Andrea Brancaccio, C.R. (13 Jan 1681 – 18 Apr 1701)
Filippo Meda (23 Jan 1702 – 18 Jul 1733 Died)
Giovanni Macario Valenti (28 Sep 1733 – 10 Apr 1744 Died)
Filippo Felice del Prete (13 Apr 1744 – 22 Dec 1751 Died)
Michele di Tarsia, C.P.O. (24 Jan 1752 – 7 May 1772 Died)
Fabio Maria Palumbo, C.R. (7 Sep 1772 – 18 Mar 1786 Died)
Nicola Vecchi (27 Feb 1792 – 18 Dec 1797)

1800 to 1986

Gennaro Carelli (18 Dec 1797 – 3 Mar 1818 Died)
Nicola Carelli (21 Feb 1820 – 14 Apr 1826 Died)
Giovanni De Simone, C.M. (3 Jul 1826 – 13 Aug 1847 Died)
Giuseppe-Maria Mucedola (11 Dec 1848 – 22 Mar 1865 Died)
Salvatore Silvestris, C.SS.R. (23 Feb 1872 – 14 Feb 1879 Died)
Augusto Antonio Vicentini (12 May 1879 – 13 May 1881)
Casimiro Gennari (13 May 1881 – 6 Feb 1897)<ref>Gennari was a native of Maratea (diocese of Policastro). He was the founder of the monthly journal Il Monitore ecclesiastico, and was a noted author of books on ecclesiastical topics. He was consecrated a bishop in Rome on 15 May 1881 by Cardinal Edward Howard. He was appointed Titular Archbishop of Naupactus on 6 February 1897, and was named a Cardinal by Pope Leo XIII on 15 April 1901.  Gennari was a collaborator in the creation of the 1917 Pio-Benedictine Code of Canon Law. As a Cardinal, and particularly as Prefect of the SC of the Council, he pressed for frequent reception of communion. He died on 31 January 1914.   G. di Ruocco, Il Cardinale Casimiro Gennari. Pastore e giurista (1839–1914) (Naples: Laurentiana 1995).</ref>
Antonio Lamberti (19 Apr 1897 – 12 Aug 1917 Died)
Domenico Lancellotti (14 Mar 1918 – 9 Jun 1930 Died)
Domenico Argnani (30 Sep 1931 – 15 Jun 1935)
Gregorio Falconieri (12 Sep 1935 – 24 May 1964 Retired)
Antonio D'Erchia (21 Jan 1970 – 30 Sep 1986) (Appointed Bishop of the renamed Conversano-Monopoli)

Diocese of Conversano-MonopoliUnited: 30 September 1986 with Diocese of MonopoliAntonio D'Erchia (30 Sep 1986 – 11 Feb 1987 Retired)
Domenico Padovano (13 Feb 1987 – 5 Feb 2016 Retired) 
Giuseppe Favale (5 Feb 2016 – )

References

Books
Reference Works
 (in Latin)
 (in Latin)

 pp. 946–947. (Use with caution; obsolete)
 (in Latin)
 (in Latin)
 (in Latin)

Studies

Kamp, Norbert (1975). Kirche und Monarchie im staufischen Königreich Sizilien: I. Prosopographische Grundlegung, Bistumer und  Bistümer und Bischöfe des Konigreichs 1194–1266: 2. Apulien und Calabrien München: Wilhelm Fink 1975.
Kehr, Paulus Fridolin (1962). Italia pontificia. Regesta pontificum Romanorum.'' Vol. IX: Samnia – Apulia – Lucania.  Berlin: Weidmann. (in Latin), pp. 358–368.

Acknowledgment

Conversano
Diocese Conversano Monopoli
Conversano